Estradiol propoxyphenylpropionate (EPPP), sold under the brand name Durovex, is an estrogen medication and estrogen ester which is no longer marketed. It is the C17β propoxyphenylpropionate (propoxyhydrocinnamate) ester of estradiol. It is a long-acting depot estrogen.

See also 
 List of estrogen esters § Estradiol esters

References 

Abandoned drugs
Estradiol esters
Synthetic estrogens